Sardar Awais Ahmad Khan Leghari (born 22 March 1971) is a Pakistani politician who is currently an Minister of Finance Department & Revenue Punjab & MPA in Punjab Assembly as well as Secretary General PML N Punjab, He has previously served as the Federal Minister for Power, in Abbasi cabinet from October 2017 to May 2018, Federal Minister of IT & Technology (tenure) and Chairman of Foreign Relations (tenure). He has also previously been elected as a member of the National Assembly of Pakistan from 2002 to 2007 and again from March 2011 to May 2018.

Early life and education

He was born on 22 March 1971 in Lahore, Pakistan to former President of Pakistan, Farooq Leghari. Awais Leghari was enrolled into the famous Aitchison College, where he excelled at sport and extracurricular activities. While he did reasonably well in his educational commitments, it was sports where Awais truly excelled, showcasing immense potential in Tennis and winning accolades in inter-school tournaments as well as acquiring the college color in 1986.

Awais Leghari took a few gap years between high school and going to university and spent his time accompanying his father to his farms. His love for agriculture started to grow there onwards. He helped his father develop land; both barren and productive land. He then went to the University of Rochester where he received a Bachelors with Honours degree in Economics and Political Science in 1994. After returning from university he started taking care of his family farms and the passion for agriculture started growing on him. He then began to research on how to incorporate state of the art international technologies into making land more product. His love for soil grew over time, in order to make it more sustainable for agricultural purposes.

He wishes to be remembered as someone who was an honest politician who retained his principles irrespective of what political party he was affiliated with. Every time he was given a key role in a political party or the government, he contributed. Someone who took care of land, who did not exploit it but rather took care of it and saved water for this planet.  His ideal was always his father, Sardar Farooq Ahmed Khan Leghari, who’s principles Awais Leghari treasures and tries following till date. He remembers his father as an individual who was God fearing, and wishes to be similar and always stay close to God throughout his life.

Political Legacy and Career
Awais Leghari being a member of a political family actively engaged in the socio-economic developmental issues of the area as well as the country and entered the political electoral arena in 1997. He won the provincial seat from Jampur, PP-204, as an independent candidate in 1997, and entered the Punjab Assembly. Thrust into the world of politics, Awais Leghari led by his Father’s example, worked hard taking care of his constituents as well as ensuring development work in the area.

In 2002, he contested in the elections and won a National Assembly seat from the Millat Party, which was led by his father and was a part of the Grand National Alliance. Afterwards, Millat Party along with Sindh Democratic Alliance merged with the ruling PML-Q in May 2004. Awais Leghari became one of the senior vice presidents of the newly constituted party.

In 2002 General Elections he was elected to both Provincial PP-204 (Rajanpur-1) and National NA-173 (National Assembly seats. He chose to be a member of the National Assembly on a ticket of National Alliance (Pakistan) from NA-173 (D.G.Khan-III) in 2002 Pakistani general election. He served as Minister for Information Technology and Telecommunications.

Carrying on his father’s legacy, Awais and his elder brother Jamal Leghari led their political group and took their constituents’ input to carry on as an effective group.  Awais left PML-Q in 2010 when the party joined the PPP-led coalition government. Awais Leghari contested and won the NA-172 seat as an independent candidate in the 2013 general elections, and later joined the ruling PML-N with his group of two MNAs and four MPAs. Aside from his National Assembly duties as a PML-N lawmaker, he chaired the prestigious National Assembly Standing Committee on Foreign Affairs. He was very active as Chairman and took some innovative initiatives like forming a link between the academia and the Parliament to have a research based platform to work from.

He ran for the seat of the National Assembly on a ticket of Pakistan Muslim League (Q) from NA-173 (D.G.Khan-III) in 2008 Pakistani general election but was unsuccessful.

He was elected again as the member of the National Assembly from NA-172 (D.G.Khan-II) in by-election held in March 2011. The seat became vacant after his father Farooq Leghari died who won the seat in 2008 election.

He returned as the member of the National Assembly as an independent candidate from NA-173 (D.G.Khan-III) in 2013 Pakistani general election. Later he joined Pakistan Muslim League (N) in May 2013.

Following the election of Shahid Khaqan Abbasi as Prime Minister of Pakistan in August 2017, he was inducted into the federal cabinet of Abbasi. He was sworn in as Federal Minister without any portfolio on 4 August 2017.

He was offered the portfolio of ministry of science and technology but he refused to accept it. Reportedly, he demanded the portfolio of privatization. In October 2017, he was made Federal Minister for Power. Upon the dissolution of the National Assembly on the expiration of its term on 31 May 2018, Leghari ceased to hold the office as Federal Minister for Power.

In the General Elections of 2018, he lost both the National Assembly and the Provincial Assembly seats, but was re-elected to the Provincial Assembly of the Punjab as a candidate of PML-N from Constituency PP-292 (Dera Ghazi Khan-VIII) in by-election held on 14 October 2018.

Federal Minister Telecom and Information Technology (2002-2007)
Tasked with the Ministry of Telecom and Information Technology, Awais shifted to Islamabad to fulfill his newfound duties and worked efficiently to deregulate the telecom sector and privatized Ufone and PTCL. Despite immense pressure that came with the decision, Awais stood tall and came up with alternatives such as ‘the voluntary separation scheme,’ to provide an opportunity to staff that had to be laid off, which helped stem PTCL’s privatization issues. The privatization of PTCL earned the economy billions of Rupees.  Due to his active work, Mobile telephony increased from 2.8 million to over 65 million from 2002-2007; a manifold boost that had never been witnessed before. Recognized as a performing ministry, Awais was nominated and selected as a Young Global Leader from the World Economic Forum, where his visits to Davos were used to highlight problems such as terrorism and poverty that Pakistan was facing.

He initiated the ICT R&D fund and Universal Service fund to create opportunities for backward areas to receive telecom and IT facilities, hundreds of thousands of jobs and scholarships for higher studies. In 2005, Pakistan won the GSM award for best cellular policy which had been drafted by Awais Leghari’s Ministry.

Chairman Fort Munroe Development Authority
Awais Leghari was made Chairman of the Forest Company of South Punjab and Chairman of the Fort Munroe Development Authority in 2016 when Shehbaz Sharif was C.M, Punjab. He aimed to bring South Punjab to the forefront of development and envisaged Fort Monroe as a clean and beautiful hill resort with botanical gardens, clean drinking water, proper sewage, apt garbage collection and reasonable amenities. As Chairman of the South Punjab Forest Company, he envisaged a public private partnership to bring 70 000 acres of blank, barren land under forestation. This project could have benefited the economy of the Country, reduced carbon emissions, made South Punjab green and raised the income level of the population of this region considerably. However, this project was scrapped by the next government.

Chairman of the Standing Committee of Foreign Affairs 
The position of Chairman of the standing committee of foreign affairs had been held by prominent personalities such as Asfandyar Wali head of ANP and late Benazir Bhutto. But given the week committee system in the Pakistan government, documentation and contributions of this committee had not been previously kept on record.

Awais Leghari when chaired the committee, the members included prominent personalities like Shah Mehmood Qureshi, Shireen Mazari, Aftab Khan Sherpao, Haider Hoti (Former CM KPK), Mehmood Khan Achakzai. Awais Leghari acquired the position with the vision to establish a benchmark for the committee.

After studying the foreign relations committee of other countries, Moeed Yousuf (National Security Advisor) who was at the time working as a Vice President at United States Institute of Peace (USIP) in Washington, helped finance the relations of the foreign affairs committee through the national secretariat and the academia. Students from NUST were then recruited and headed by the senior faculty at NUST, to create, research and suggest solutions to various historical, contemporary and upcoming scenarios in the international world. The students studied Pakistan’s relations with various sovereign entities and weighed the pros and cons of each relationship, analyzing the circumstances of each situation and accessing it. The committee would then discuss the conclusive research with experts of foreign relations and relevant personals at the foreign office of Pakistan. Experts such as Ambassador to European Union, Jahangir Ashraf Qazi, Maliha Lodhi and Riaz Muhammad Khan were invited to discuss each research. The Ambassador to Afghanistan and China were also subsequently invited to discuss the bilateral relations Pakistan had with each of these countries. The committee also held public hearings.

Awais Leghari during his 3-year tenure as the chairman made concrete efforts to constitutionalize the committee. The committee also authored many papers to formalize the contributions made during this time. The committee also sent a written recommendation to the foreign office on behalf of the national assembly regarding the bilateral relations of Pakistan with India and Afghanistan. This was a milestone for the Foreign Affairs Committee previously never set or achieved. The committee recommended a Pak-Afghan Policy to the foreign office, and within 6–7 months the Government of Pakistan announced a Pak-Afghan Policy remarkably similar to the one authored by the Foreign Affairs Committee.

References

1971 births
Living people
Baloch people
Punjab MPAs 1997–1999
Pakistani MNAs 2002–2007
Pakistani MNAs 2008–2013
Pakistani MNAs 2013–2018
Pakistan Muslim League (N) MNAs
Government ministers of Pakistan
Information Ministers of Pakistan
Awais
People from Dera Ghazi Khan District
University of Rochester alumni